The Center for a New American Security (CNAS) is a Washington, D.C. based think tank established in 2007 by co-founders Michèle Flournoy, board member of military contractor Booz Allen Hamilton, and Kurt M. Campbell, coordinator for Indo-Pacific Affairs in the Biden Administration. Funded by Northrop Grumman, dozens of military contractors, Chevron, Amazon, Google and other large corporations, CNAS specializes in United States national security issues, such as terrorism, irregular warfare, the future of the U.S. military, the emergence of Asia as a global power center, war games pitting the US against the People's Republic of China and the national security implications of natural resource consumption.

The administration of President Barack Obama hired several CNAS employees for key jobs. Founders Michèle Flournoy and Kurt Campbell formerly served as the Undersecretary of Defense for Policy and the Assistant Secretary of State for East Asian and Pacific Affairs, respectively. In June 2009 The Washington Post suggested, "In the era of Obama... the Center for a New American Security may emerge as Washington's go-to think tank on military affairs." Later, press critical of US foreign policy described CNAS as a think tank that has "long pushed Democrats to embrace war and militarism."

CNAS advisors have included John Nagl, David Kilcullen, Andrew Exum, Thomas E. Ricks, Robert D. Kaplan, and Marc Lynch. CNAS was formerly led by CEO Victoria Nuland, who serves as Undersecretary of State for Political Affairs in the Biden administration's State Department.

Employees, budget, and writings 
CNAS has approximately 30 employees and a budget under $6 million. The organization's top donors include Northrop Grumman Aerospace Systems, Open Society Foundations, Airbus Group, The Boeing Company, Chevron Corporation, Lockheed Martin Corporation, Raytheon Company, the Taipei Economic and Cultural Representative Office, the United States government, BAE Systems, BP America and Exxon Mobil Corporation.

CNAS commentators have been quoted in numerous national media outlets, including Foreign Policy, The New York Times, The Washington Post, The Wall Street Journal, The National Interest, The Daily Show with Jon Stewart, C-SPAN, NBC and MSNBC, Fox News, NPR, CNN, and PBS.

Research and initiatives 

CNAS has released extensive reports on terrorism, irregular warfare, and regional security challenges.

Before joining CNAS, John Nagl served as an active-duty officer in both the first Gulf War and in Operation Iraqi Freedom. He then was part of the team that wrote FM 3-24, the Army's counter-insurgency field manual that changed the way the wars in Iraq and Afghanistan were conducted. Since joining CNAS first as a Senior Fellow and then as President, Nagl has continued to delve into counterinsurgency while also publishing papers on other topics, including the need for a permanent corps of Army advisers and strategies for confronting Islamic extremism.

CNAS has also staked out the terrain in studying the emergence of Asia as a center of global power, particularly with regards to China. One of the main stated goals of CNAS's Asia-Pacific Security program is to "devise a future path for America's engagement of China that can expand bilateral cooperation in areas of shared strategic interest and encourage increasing accountability from the Chinese regime."

In 2008-2009, CNAS pushed environmental security, especially on climate change and energy. The organization released a report in 2009 called "Natural Security" by Senior Fellow Sharon Burke, which looked at the national security context for natural resources, including energy, critical minerals, land, water, biodiversity, and climate change. CNAS continues to lead on such research with Elizabeth Rosenberg, a former Treasury Department official who runs the Energy, Economics, and Security Program.

The CNAS U.S.-India Initiative is co-chaired by CNAS Board of Directors members Richard Armitage, former Deputy Secretary of State, and Ambassador R. Nicholas Burns, former Under Secretary of State for Political Affairs. The stated goal of the Initiative is to help advance growing bilateral ties in areas of mutual interest, including security, economics, energy, climate change, democracy, and human rights. On October 27, 2010, at the White House Press Gaggle on the President's Upcoming Trip to India, the CNAS report Natural Allies: A Blueprint for the Future of U.S.-India Relations was referenced in a reporter's question to White House Press Secretary Robert Gibbs.

In 2010, the Center developed its Cyber Security project, which is co-chaired by Bob Kahn, the co-inventor of the TCP/IP protocols used to transmit information over the Internet; Vice Admiral John Michael McConnell, USN (Ret.), former Director of National Intelligence; Joseph Nye, Distinguished Service Professor at Harvard University; and Peter Schwartz, a futurist and business strategist and member of the CNAS Board of Directors. In February 2011, CNAS Vice President and Director of Studies Kristin Lord and Research Associate Travis Sharp argued in The Hill that "increased federal attention to cybersecurity makes good sense," but "lawmakers must ensure that the U.S. government does not spend aimlessly on cybersecurity."

CNAS has suggested that one way to contain future military costs would be to move heavy army units into the Army National Guard and Army Reserve. Still, military officials have responded that the governors would rather have light units that are better suited to their emergency needs.

Papers for the Next President Series
In May 2016, CNAS launched its Papers for the Next President series to assist the next president and his team in crafting a strong, pragmatic, and principled national security agenda. The series explores the critical regions and topics that the next president will need to address early in his tenure and includes actionable recommendations designed to be implemented during the first few months of 2017. Since its inception, CNAS has released 12 reports on topics including U.S.-Russia Relations, transatlantic security cooperation in the Asia-Pacific, and U.S. strategy in the Middle East.

Funding and controversy 
Shortly after CNAS formed, it was noted by the Wall Street Journal and others that it was "rapidly emerging as a top farm team for the incoming Obama administration." This was concerning since nearly 30 defense contractors, including Boeing, General Dynamics, Lockheed Martin, Northrop Grumman, and Raytheon; NATO; several foreign governments, including Taiwan and United Arab Emirates; the oil companies BP and Chevron; investment banks including Bank of America and JPMorgan Chase; technology firms, such as Facebook, Google, and Microsoft; the U.S. Department of State, and two different Pentagon offices primarily fund the organization—creating a conflict of interest.

When co-founder, Kurt Campbell, was questioned by Jim Webb before Congress about the potential for conflict, he replied, "We've kept a very clear line. Not one of our publications, not one of our public advocacies ever touches on anything that these companies worked on." However, according to a report by the Center for Economic and Policy Research's Revolving Door Project, the Center has repeatedly violated its own ethics policy without acknowledgement of the violations. For example, CNAS received $100,000 to $249,999 in funding from Taiwan in the fiscal years preceding a 2020 report to Washington on "Rising to the China Challenge," where they advised America should invest "considerable amounts of money, senior-level attention, and bureaucratic focus" to, among other things, "strengthen its diplomatic and security relationship with Taiwan.

CNAS has a board of advisors in addition to its board of directors that "actively contributes to the development of the Center's research and expands [their] community of interest," with members who "engage regularly with the intellectual power generated at CNAS, though they do not have official governance or fiduciary oversight responsibilities." Many advisory board members have donated to CNAS in prior years.

In addition, many involved in CNAS go on to become government employees. For example Victoria Nuland, who was the former CEO of CNAS, is President Biden's current Undersecretary of State for Political Affairs. In one article she published after leaving the CNAS, she called for increased defense spending and weapons development, as well as to "establish permanent bases along NATO's eastern border." The governments of two nations on NATO's eastern border, Latvia and Lithuania, are recent contributors to CNAS.

CNAS received and returned funds from FTX.

References

External links 
 Center for a New American Security (CNAS)

 
Foreign policy and strategy think tanks in the United States
Organizations established in 2007
Neoconservatism
Organizations based in Washington, D.C.